Oakdale Public School at the corner of Hastings Avenue and Noblestown Road in Oakdale, Pennsylvania, United States was built in 1894 in the Romanesque Revival style. Later known as Hastings School, it served grades 1-8 and was the only grade school in Oakdale until 1972, when it was closed. The building then stood empty until at least 1997. 

The building was added to the National Register of Historic Places on March 28, 1997.

In 2001, the structure was renovated into an apartment building.

References

School buildings on the National Register of Historic Places in Pennsylvania
Buildings and structures in Allegheny County, Pennsylvania
School buildings completed in 1905
Romanesque Revival architecture in Pennsylvania
National Register of Historic Places in Allegheny County, Pennsylvania
1905 establishments in Pennsylvania